Secret World Live is the second live album and tenth album overall by the English rock musician Peter Gabriel, released on 30 August 1994 in the UK. The album documents the concert experience of the Secret World Tour. A concert film of the same name was released simultaneously. Its track listing omits "Red Rain" and adds "San Jacinto" after "Blood of Eden".

Cover artwork
The artwork for the album cover was directed by Michael Colson and co-ordinated by Martha Ladly (formerly of Martha and the Muffins) who was working for Gabriel at the time, with cover images by Fab 4 and Danny Jenkins. It received a nomination for the 1994 Grammy Award for Best Record Sleeve Packaging Design. Danny Jenkins said of his photograph: “I have always been interested in making images and had amassed an extensive collection of 80s office detritus for my digital montages [...] The core photograph of the album was shot in my studio back yard with my Pentax K1000 camera [...] The receiver was randomly picked from a pile of phones and the hand actually belongs to my long-suffering studio assistant Becky Jemmett. It was pure luck and chance that the phone and hand were a convincing enough match for Peter’s on-stage version."

Track listing

Personnel
 Peter Gabriel – lead vocals, harmonica, keyboards, rainstick
 Paula Cole – additional vocals; co-lead vocals on "Shaking The Tree", "Blood Of Eden" and "Don't Give Up".
 L. Shankar – violins, additional vocals
 David Rhodes – guitar, backing vocals
 Jean-Claude Naimro – keyboards, backing vocals
 Tony Levin – bass, Chapman Stick, backing vocals
 Manu Katché – drums
 Levon Minassian – doudouk

Additional musicians 
 Leo Nocentelli – guitar, backing vocals
 Daniel Lanois – dobro, Fender Telecaster electric guitar
 Babacar Faye – djembe
 Hossam Ramzy – surdo
 Assane Thiam – talking drum, Tama drums
 Tim Green – tenor saxophone
 Reggie Houston – baritone saxophone
 Wayne Jackson – trumpet, cornet
 Renard Poche – trombone

Guest artists
 Papa Wemba and his band Molokai
 Papa Wemba – vocals
 Patrick Marie Magdelaine – guitar
 Dominique Berose – keyboards
 Herve Rakotofiringa – keyboards
 Noel Ekwabi – bass
 Joseph Kuo – drums
 Xavier Jouvelet – percussion
 "Reddy" Mela Amissi – backing vocals
 "Styno Mubi Matadi" – backing vocals
 Ayub Ogada – backing vocals

Charts

Weekly charts

Year-end charts

Singles

Certifications

References

External links
 Peter Gabriel - Secret World Live (1994) album review by Stephen Thomas Erlewine, credits & releases at AllMusic
 Peter Gabriel - Secret World Live (1994) VHS/DVD/Blu-ray track listing, credits & releases at AllMusic
 Peter Gabriel - Secret World Live (1994) album releases & credits at Discogs
 Peter Gabriel - Secret World Live (1994) VHS/Laserdisc/DVD/Blu-ray releases & credits at Discogs
 
 Peter Gabriel - Secret World Live (1994) album to be listened on Spotify

Peter Gabriel albums
1994 live albums
Live video albums
1994 video albums
Real World Records live albums
Real World Records video albums
Geffen Records live albums
Virgin Records live albums
Geffen Records video albums
Virgin Records video albums
Grammy Award for Best Long Form Music Video